Louie Michael Roble Casas (born 12 March 1986) is a Filipino former footballer who last played as a goalkeeper for Kaya–Iloilo in the Philippines Football League. He previously played in the now defunct UFL Division 1 for Ceres. Casas was a member of the Philippines national football team being part of the squad in the 2004 AFF Championship.

Career

Ceres-Negros
In 2013, after graduating in University of St. La Salle he joined UFL Division 2 club Ceres. On 23 February 2016, he made his AFC Cup debut with Ceres F.C. in a 2-2 draw against Selangor FA.

Global Cebu
On 2018, after his five-year stint with Ceres, he joined fellow Philippines Football League club Global Cebu on a free transfer.

Kaya F.C.–Iloilo
Casas was signed by Kaya F.C.–Iloilo in January 2019. He led the team to win the 2021 Copa Paulino Alcantara. He retired from competitive football in January 2022.

International career
Casas made his debut for the Philippines in the 2004 AFF Championship.

After 14 years, in September 2018, he was again called-up in the Philippines squad for a national team training camp, and a friendly game against Bahrain.

References

External links

 

1986 births
Living people
Association football goalkeepers
Filipino footballers
Ceres–Negros F.C. players
Philippines international footballers
Sportspeople from Cebu
People from Danao, Cebu
University of St. La Salle alumni
Cebuano people
Visayan people